Alistair Wilson was a banker aged 30 living in Nairn, Scotland who was shot to death on his doorstep on 28 November 2004. The ensuing murder inquiry was one of the largest ever carried out in Scotland and the crime remains unsolved. The apparent lack of motive and other unexplained elements of the murder have led to it being described as 'Scotland's most mysterious unsolved crime' and 'one of the most baffling cases of modern times', and it has attracted ongoing press coverage ever since.

Background 
Wilson lived in Crescent Road in Nairn along with his wife Veronica and two young children. Veronica's father also lived in the building, in a flat at the top of the house. At the time of the murder, Alistair was the business manager at the local Bank of Scotland branch.

Crime 
At around 7 pm on 28 November 2004, the doorbell of the Wilsons' house was rung and Veronica answered the door. An unidentified man wearing a baseball cap, dark blue jacket and dark jeans stood on the doorstep. He asked for Alistair Wilson by name and Wilson went to speak to him. A few minutes later he returned to his wife carrying an empty blue envelope with the name Paul on the front. Confused, he went back to the door, at which point Veronica Wilson heard three gunshots and, on going to the door, discovered her husband had been shot. He died in hospital later that evening.

In October 2020, The Guardian reported that Alistair's son Andrew was appealing for information about his father's murder. The police had revealed the type of firearm used, a 0.25 calibre Haenel Suhl pocket pistol from the 1930s and wanted help in identifying any user of such a pistol.

In April 2022, Police Scotland announced that Wilson's involvement in a local planning dispute was a likely motive for his murder.

See also
Murders of Harry and Megan Tooze – similar apparently motiveless shootings in the UK in 1993 which are also unsolved 
Murder of George Murdoch – another notorious unsolved Scottish murder that like Wilson's featured on the STV programme Unsolved

References 

Scottish murder victims
People from Nairn
2004 deaths
Year of birth missing
Place of birth missing
Unsolved murders in Scotland
People murdered in Scotland
Deaths by firearm in Scotland